Le Poizat is a former commune in the Ain department in eastern France. On 1 January 2016, it was merged into the new commune Le Poizat-Lalleyriat.

Population

See also
Communes of the Ain department
Lac de Sylans

References

Former communes of Ain
Ain communes articles needing translation from French Wikipedia
Populated places disestablished in 2016